Maria Blom (1914 – 1994) was a 20th-century Dutch carillonneur and the first woman to work as a professional carillonneur in the Netherlands.

Life and career 
Blom served as the carillonneur of the Sint Janskerk in Gouda from 1943-1985, and also played in IJsselstein and Kamerik. In a 1960 interview for a women’s magazine, Blom recounted how her private teacher Ferdinand Timmermans temporarily ceased teaching her, given that she had little hope of being accepted to the Royal Carillon School "Jef Denyn" as a woman. Unruffled, she hosted a summer concert series one year of exclusively women performers. She also established Gouda's famed Candle Night tradition with mobile carillon.

References

External links 
Finding aid for the Sint Janskerk at the Anton Brees Carillon Library 
Recorded interview with and performance by Maria Blom

Carillonneurs
Dutch keyboardists
20th-century classical musicians
Dutch women musicians
Women organists
Dutch organists